Sergiu Vasile Bejan (born 18 November 1996) is a Romanian rower. A 2022 World Champion in the coxless pair, he also competed in the men's eight event at the 2020 Summer Olympics.

References

External links

1996 births
Living people
Romanian male rowers
Olympic rowers of Romania
Rowers at the 2020 Summer Olympics
Sportspeople from Suceava
World Rowing Championships medalists for Romania
21st-century Romanian people